Nethrana is a village in Hanumangarh District of Rajasthan state, in India. This is the largest village of Bhadra tehsil.
It is situated on Gogamedi-Sirsa road.     
Nearby towns/cities are :-
Gogamedi - 7 km. away 
Bhadra - 25 km. away
Sirsa - 37 km.away .

External links 

Villages in Hanumangarh district

In villages 10000 population.This village, which has made a different identity in itself, is now known for the electricity movement and also for other revolutionary activities.  This village movement was run by Shelendra Nimiwal.